Van Valkenburgh–Isbister Farm is a historic home and farm complex located at Ghent in Columbia County, New York.  The complex is spread over two properties and includes 14 contributing buildings and two contributing structures.

First property
The first property includes the Van Valkenburgh–Isbister farmhouse (c. 1790, with later additions), an 18th-century barn, stable (c. 1850–1880), two wagon sheds (c. 1850–1880), garage (c. 1930), carriage barn and barn (c. 1850–1880), smoke house (c. 1850), outhouse (c. 1900–1925), and gas pump (c. 1930).

Second property
The second property has a dwelling (c. 1840), shed (c. 1875), carriage barn (c. 1875), dwelling / shed (c. 1910), and outhouse (c. 1940). The Van Valkenburgh–Isbister farmhouse consists of a -story rear block dated to about 1790 and a -story front section with Greek Revival detailing dated to about 1845.

It was added to the National Register of Historic Places in 2006.

References

Houses on the National Register of Historic Places in New York (state)
Farms on the National Register of Historic Places in New York (state)
Houses completed in 1790
Houses in Columbia County, New York
National Register of Historic Places in Columbia County, New York